The Hyderabad–Nanded Passenger is a passenger rail service which operates between the cities of Hyderabad in the Indian state of Andhra Pradesh and Nanded in the Indian state of Maharashtra. It is operated by the South Central Railway region of the Indian Railways. The service lists under the Secunderabad and Nanded division of the South Central Railway. This is a daily service.

Train Numbers 
Hyderabad to Nanded - 17564
Nanded to Hyderabad - 57564

Timings 
 This is a daily service.
 The train travels a distance of 281 km.
 The duration of the journey is 8 hours and 15 minutes.

Composition 

HYB-NED Passenger consists of coaches without sleeper berths as no part of the journey both ways is at night. It has a seasonally-determined number of Second Class (II) general unreserved compartments along with reserved Chair Cars (CC) and usually one or two air-conditioned chair cars (ACC).

Locomotive 

The entire Nanded division of the South Central Railway has non-electrified track. Hence, a single WDM2A locomotive hauls the train both ways, the locomotive usually belongs to the Guntakal, Maula Ali or Pune sheds.

Halts 
The trains halts at 27 intermediate stations or all the stations on the route.

HYB—Hyderabad (Source)
STPD—Sitafalmandi
MJF—Malkajgiri
BMO—Bolarum
GWV—Gowdavalli
MED—Medchal
WDR—Wadiaram
MZL—Mirzapalli
AKE—Akanapet
KMC—Kamareddi
NZB—Nizamabad
BSX—Basar
DAB—Dharmabad
UMRI—Umri
MUE—Mudkhed Junction
NED—Nanded (Destination)

See also
 Rail transport in India
 South Central Railway

References

Slow and fast passenger trains in India
Transport in Hyderabad, India
Transport in Nanded
Rail transport in Telangana
Rail transport in Maharashtra